KIWB-LD (channel 43) is a low-power television station in Boise, Idaho, United States. It is owned by Cocola Broadcasting.

Subchannel

External links

IWB-LD
Television channels and stations established in 1989
1989 establishments in Idaho
Low-power television stations in the United States